"Bang Bang" is a single by English drum and bass producer DJ Fresh and Diplo featuring vocals from R. City, Selah Sue, and Craig David. The song was produced by Dr. Luke and released as a digital download on 9 December 2016 through Ministry of Sound as the eighth single from Fresh's forthcoming fourth studio album.

Track listing

Chart performance

Weekly charts

Certifications

Release history

References

2016 songs
2016 singles
DJ Fresh songs
Diplo songs
Rock City (duo) songs
Selah Sue songs
Craig David songs
Songs written by Craig David
Songs written by Dr. Luke
Songs written by Theron Thomas
Songs written by Timothy Thomas
Songs written by Diplo
Songs written by Cirkut (record producer)
Songs written by Charli XCX
Ministry of Sound singles
Song recordings produced by DJ Fresh
Songs written by DJ Fresh